Doctor Who: Podshock (commonly referred to as Podshock, but officially titled Outpost Gallifrey Presents… Doctor Who: Podshock) is a weekly podcast about the British science fiction television series Doctor Who.  The podcast, which originated in 2005, is produced by the Gallifreyan Embassy, a Doctor Who fan group originally based in Long Island, New York.

Doctor Who: Podshock is also significant for being the first podcast to be officially attached to the world's largest Doctor Who online community, Outpost Gallifrey.  Further, it was the first Doctor Who podcast to feature both British and American hosts, along with regular contributors from other parts of the English-speaking world.

History
Podshock has its origins on Long Island, New York. The first meeting of the fan club which would eventually spawn Podshock was held in a Holiday Inn in Rockville Centre on or about 18 June 1985.  It was one of many local clubs being formed around the US during the early 1980s heyday of the PBS broadcast of so-called "classic" Doctor Who.  Principally, the group existed to mobilize support for PBS pledge drives, but it also formed a support network for those wishing to attend conventions, watch the programme in a social environment, and to generally help promote the programme in their area.   One of the membership benefits was a printed newsletter, which, over time, was supplanted by a website.  When the new series of Doctor Who began in 2005, the Gallifreyan Embassy decided on a new means by which to deliver their content.  On August 9, 2005, the first episode of the club's then-new podcast was released.  The name they chose for this new audio publication — Podshock — was a reference both to podcasting and to the 1982 Doctor Who serial, Earthshock.

June 2015 marked the 10th Anniversary of Podshock. The occasion was acknowledged by special episodes.

Affiliation with Outpost Gallifrey
On January 21, 2007 the podcast became affiliated with the Doctor Who fan website, Outpost Gallifrey.  It was after this alliance that the name of the podcast was changed to include a reference to Outpost Gallifrey.  It was the only podcast officially associated with the popular Doctor Who website.  However, on December 1, 2007, the Outpost was reduced to a gateway to other sites, and an archive of the site's final incarnation; Podshock continued to be released until the summer of 2009 under a logo bearing the words, "Outpost Gallifrey Presents," until removing that nomenclature after the site officially shut down.

Format
All episodes of Podshock, regardless of their content, have something things in common.  All episodes of Podshock, regardless of type, begin with a stylized intro.  Generally, but not always, a clip from the classic or current series is played.  Then, spoken either by one of the hosts, or via a pre-recorded insert, the same phrase begins every episode: "Live!  From ___! It's Doctor Who: Podshock!", in a fashion similar to the opening skits in Saturday Night Live.  The blank is filled in by a different place relative to the Doctor Who universe.  It has become a popular pastime amongst listeners to offer hints on how to fill in the blank.

Podshock "proper"
The bulk of the episodes of Podshock involve at least two of the three main hosts connected via Skype.  These episodes tend to have a great deal of post-production work added to them, resulting in a product that approximates studio recording.

A typical episode will run for 80–110 minutes, and contains discussion on all things related to Doctor Who, including the television series (both old and new), audio plays by Big Finish, books, merchandise, and the various spin-off series. The show typically starts off with a news section which presents Doctor Who-related news from the previous week. The features segment usually follows the news. This generally consists of discussion and reviews of various Doctor Who-related topics.  Often, the featured material is pre-recorded in the form of an interview or a review.   Feedback from listeners is also included towards the end of the episode, facilitated in part by a call-in line maintained by the Gallifreyan Embassy.

The occasional interviews on the main show have included the actors Colin Baker, Deborah Watling, Jules Burt and Eugene Washington, music composers Murray Gold and Mark Ayres and writers John Peel, Steven Moffat, Tom MacRae and Paul Cornell. Interviews from archive sources, mostly with people who were involved in the original series of Doctor Who, also feature from time to time.  These have included Jon Pertwee, Sylvester McCoy, Sophie Aldred, John Nathan-Turner and Peter Davison.

Aftershocks
On occasion, a much shorter version of the podcast will be published.  This type of show debuted on 5 February 2006 and received the name "Aftershock", in deference to the fact that it usually gave a bit more information about a topic that had been covered in the previous week's podcast.  Generally they are hosted by only one of the three hosts and aim to give greater context to a story previously reported, impart some late-breaking news, or explain why a forthcoming episode is being delayed.

TalkShoe roundtables

Podshock: LIVE!
Roundtable discussions were occasionally attempted on the show prior to 2007.  However, with the coming of the third series of Doctor Who in March 2007, Podshock adopted a new technology, TalkShoe, to facilitate much larger numbers of participants at one time.  Starting with Episode 73, an uninterrupted run of 16 weekly episodes began wherein anyone could call in and be placed on the air. However, the recording technology of TalkShoe proved problematic.  Initially, host and editor Louis Trapani attempted to clean up each episode through post-production.  By episode 80, though, that practice was abandoned entirely, with Trapani noting on air that the post-production wasn't helping to improve the audio.  The decision to stop post-production on the TalkShoe episodes was also motivated by the fact that they were almost immediately available to listeners in their raw form on the TalkShoe website itself.  Thus, these episodes developed the secondary name, Podshock LIVE!, used primarily on the TalkShoe website.

This type of Podshock has become dominant since they were introduced.  From  14 April 2007, until 26 May 2008, the ratio of Podshock: Live! to Podshock was about 4:1.  In May 2008, the decision was taken to more formally separate the live roundtables from the studio recordings.  Hence, for the fourth series of Doctor Who, roundtable discussions of individual episodes were no longer part of the main subscription feed, and are considered a separate podcast by the hosts.

Production
Since September 2005 the show has been produced in two audio formats: an enhanced version, encoded in AAC, and an MP3 version. Both have the same audio content, but the enhanced version also includes embedded chapter markers, images and hyperlinks.  Initial episodes of the TalkShoe roundtables also were available in both enhanced and non-enhanced versions, but this practice was abandoned when post-production on that type of episode stopped.

Reception

By critics and general audiences
Podshock is, according to iTunes, the most popular Doctor Who podcast.

A review in a 2007 issue of SciFi Now gave the show four out of five stars, describing it as "seriously meaty" analysis of Doctor Who and "the perfect accompaniment to the television series", while at the same time noting that the presenters were "massive Dr. Who aficionados" whose personalities were obscured behind a "voiceover [that] is slow, dull and very hard work."

The show is sometimes taken to task for its length.  For instance, commentators at the Tachyon TV podcast website noted that the 24 June 2007 episode of Tachyon TV was "as funny as one would expect and at half an hour, a good 12 hours shorter than your average Podshock."

By production team
At least one Doctor Who writer, Paul Cornell, was at one time a devoted listener of Podshock. Writing on his own blog in February 2007, he noted that, even though a colleague of his had appeared on the DWO Whocast, he was "still a Podshock boy at heart," although later that year he actually appeared on DWO Whocast.

References

External links
 Art Trap productions
 The Gallifreyan Embassy

Audio podcasts
Podshock
Film and television podcasts
2005 podcast debuts
2018 podcast endings